High Voltage is a live album by American jazz saxophonist Eddie Harris recorded in 1968 and 1969 and released on the Atlantic label.

Reception
The Allmusic review calls it "Fascinating music, and a jazz radio staple in its time".

Track listing
All compositions by Eddie Harris except as indicated
 "Movin' On Out" - 6:12 
 "Funky Doo" (Harris, Melvin Jackson) - 8:11 
 "The Children's Song" - 3:27 
 "Ballad (For My Love)" - 4:58 
 "Is There a Place for Us" - 5:57 
 "Listen Here" - 3:47 
Recorded at Shelly's Manne-Hole in Hollywood, California on October 28, 1968 (tracks 3 & 5), and at The Village Gate, Greenwich Village, New York City on April 19, 1969

Personnel
Eddie Harris - tenor saxophone, varitone 
Jodie Christian - piano
Melvin Jackson - bass
Richard Smith (tracks 3 & 5), Billy Hart (tracks 1, 2, 4 & 6) - drums

References 

Eddie Harris live albums
1969 albums
Albums produced by Joel Dorn
Atlantic Records live albums
Albums recorded at Shelly's Manne-Hole
Albums recorded at the Village Gate